is the debut studio album of Japanese singer-songwriter Shiori Niiyama. It was released on 26 March 2014 under Being label. Album includes previous 5 released singles. The album reached #39 rank first week. Album charted for 4 weeks.

Track listing
All songs were written by Shiori Niiyama and arranged by Masanori Sasaji

In media
Looking to the sky was used as ending theme for TV Tokyo program Crossroad
Yureru Yureru was used as insert theme song for movie Zekkyō Gakkyū
Ima Koko ni Iru was used as commercial song for Kuraray company
Hitori Goto was used as ending theme for Tokyo Broadcasting System Television program CDTV
Don't cry was used as theme song for movie Zekkyō Gakkyū

References

2014 debut albums
Shiori Niiyama albums
Being Inc. albums
Japanese-language albums